The Pulemyot Maxima PM1910 (PM M1910) (Russian: Пулемёт Максима образца 1910 года, Pulemyot Maxima obraztsa 1910 goda – "Maxim's machine gun Model 1910") is a heavy machine gun that was used by the Imperial Russian Army during World War I and the Red Army during the Russian Civil War and World War II. Later the gun saw service in the Korean War, the Vietnam War and the 2022 Russian invasion of Ukraine.

History
It was adopted in August 1910 and was derived from Hiram Maxim's Maxim gun, chambered for the standard Russian 7.62×54mmR rifle cartridge. The M1910 was mounted on a wheeled mount with a gun shield.

In 1918–1920, the industry of Soviet Russia produced 21 thousand new Maxim 1910 machine guns for the Red Army.

In 1930, a modernized version 1910/30 was adopted by the Red Army. M1910/30 can be equipped with optical sight.

In 1941, the gun was modernized once again.

In May 1942, an order was given to begin the development of a new machine gun to replace the Maxim 1910/30. On May 15, 1943, the SG-43 Goryunov was adopted and since summer 1943 Maxim guns were replaced in Soviet service by the SG-43, which retained the wheeled and shielded carriage. However, production of the Maxim did not end until 1945.

In addition to the main infantry version, there were aircraft-mounted and naval variants. Some were fitted with a tractor radiator cap fitted on top of the water jacket to allow handfuls of snow to be packed in to melt while firing.

After World War 2, the Maxim was phased out of service, but was still sent in some quantities to the Korean War and Vietnam War. In 2014 during the War in Donbas, some Maxims in stock were captured by the Pro-Russian separatists while others were taken from storage to be used by the Ukrainian Armed Forces. A number were used by the Ukrainian military during the 2022 Russian invasion of Ukraine due to their reputation for accuracy and reliability.

Variants

"Maxim's machine gun model 1910 on a wheeled Sokolov's mount" (Пулемёт Максима обр. 1910 года на колёсном станке А. А. Соколова обр. 1910 года)
"Maxim's machine gun model 1915 on a wheeled Kolesnikov's mount" (Пулемёт Максима обр. 1910 года на колёсном станке Колесникова обр. 1915 года)

 "Maxim's machine gun model 1910 on an antiaircraft tripod" (Пулемёт Максима образца 1910 года на зенитной треноге М. Н. Кондакова обр. 1928 года)
"Maxim's machine gun model 1910/30 on a wheeled Vladimirov's mount" (Пулемёт Максима образца 1910/30 года на колёсном станке С. В. Владимирова обр. 1931 года)
Maxim-Tokarev
PV-1 machine gun
ZPU-4 (Зенитная пулемётная установка М-4 образца 1931 года) - quadruple anti-aircraft mount.

Maxim M/09-21
Maxim M/32-33
 Second Polish Republic
 7.92mm Maxim wz. 1910/28

Users
 - a quantity of machine guns were seized during World War I

  - In January 1942 first twelve Soviet Maxim 1910/30 machine guns were given from USSR to 1st Czechoslovak Independent Infantry Battalion, later additional quantity was given to other units of the 1st Czechoslovak Army Corps.

 - a quantity of machine guns was seized during World War I
 - After June 22, 1941, a quantity of machine guns was seized by Hungarian troops during Axis invasion in USSR. Since 1945, Soviet Maxim 1910/30 machine guns were given from USSR to People's Republic of Hungary
 Mongolia
  - In September 1939 a quantity of Polish wz. 1910 and wz. 1910/28 was seized by Wehrmacht. After June 22, 1941, a quantity of Soviet machine guns was seized by German troops during Axis invasion in USSR, they were used as schweres Maschinengewehr 216(r)

 / White movement
Russian separatist forces in Donbas
 / 
 - at least several machine guns were captured during the Allied intervention in the Russian Civil War and disarmament of retreating armed anti-Soviet groups crossing the Romanian border in 1917 - 1920s. After June 22, 1941, an additional quantity was seized by Romanian troops during Axis invasion in USSR. In 1944 several Soviet Maxim 1910/30 machine guns were given from USSR to Romanian 1st Volunteer Infantry Division. After 23 August 1944 coup d'état additional Maxim 1910/30 machine guns were transferred from USSR to the Romanian army
 Second Polish Republic – Maxim wz. 1910 and Maxim wz. 1910/28
 Second Spanish Republic
: in August 2011, 35 000 ex-Soviet Maxim machine guns were stored in the warehouses of the Ministry of Defense of Ukraine although at least four of them were written off and scrapped later. They were used during the War in Donbas by Ukrainian troops. In December 2016 they were officially adopted by the Armed Forces of Ukraine

Gallery

See also
List of Russian Weaponry
Maxim gun
MG-08
Vickers machine gun

References

External links

 Soviet Manual Covering Operation and Repair of the 1910 Maxim Gun
 Robert G. Segel (24 February 2012) "The Origin of the Russian “Tractor-Cap” M1910 Maxim", Small Arms Defense Journal, Vol. 4, No. 1

7.62×54mmR machine guns
Heavy machine guns
Firearms of the Russian Empire
Machine guns of Russia
Machine guns of the Soviet Union
Early machine guns
World War I machine guns
World War I Russian infantry weapons
World War II machine guns
World War II military equipment of Finland
World War II infantry weapons of Poland
World War II infantry weapons of the Soviet Union